Il rossetto (internationally released as Lipstick) is a 1960 Italian crime-drama film directed by Damiano Damiani in his feature film debut, after two documentaries and several screenplays. The film's plot was loosely inspired by actual events. Pietro Germi reprised, with very slight modifications, the character he played in Un maledetto imbroglio.

Cast 
Pierre Brice: Gino
Georgia Moll: Lorella
Pietro Germi: Commissario Fioresi
Laura Vivaldi: Silvana
Bella Darvi: Nora 
Ivano Staccioli: Mauri
Renato Mambor: Vincenzo
Erna Schürer: Cinzia

References

External links

1960 films
Films directed by Damiano Damiani
Italian crime drama films
1960 crime drama films
Drama films based on actual events
Films with screenplays by Cesare Zavattini
Films scored by Giovanni Fusco
1960s Italian-language films
1960s Italian films